is a toy designer employed by Takara since 1980. Mr. Ōno's early designs included the Diaclone Walk-In Centre and Microman Acro Saturn. He designed most of the Diaclone Car Robot line (with additional design work by Shoji Kawamori) and Car Microman figures, which drew the attention of the U.S. toy company Hasbro. Hasbro amalgamated the Diaclone and Microman figures and, along with a story treatment developed by Marvel, created the toy cult phenomenon known as the Transformers. Ōno continued to design Transformers throughout the 1980s until the end of the original franchise.

Ōno designed most Transformers manufactured by Takara, including Metroplex, Fortress Maximus and Powermaster Optimus Prime. Among the hundreds of Transformers that he designed, he considers the Decepticon Triple Changers Blitzwing and Astrotrain to be his finest achievements in toy design.

Although Mr. Ōno no longer designs Transformer toys, as of 2005, he is still employed by Takara where he continues to design figures in other Takara toylines.

External links
 Takara Staff Interview: Ōno Kōjin
 Official Takara Transformers site 

Toy inventors
Mechanical designers (mecha)
Living people
1959 births